Aristotelia aphthoropa is a moth of the family Gelechiidae. It was described by Turner in 1939. It is found in Australia, where it has been recorded from Tasmania.

The wingspan is 12–13 mm.

References

Moths described in 1939
Aristotelia (moth)
Moths of Australia